Steven Levy (born 1951) is an American journalist and Editor at Large for Wired who has written extensively for publications on computers, technology, cryptography, the internet, cybersecurity, and privacy. He is the author of the 1984 book Hackers: Heroes of the Computer Revolution, which chronicles the early days of the computer underground. Levy published eight books covering computer hacker culture, artificial intelligence, cryptography, and multi-year exposés of Apple, Google, and Facebook. His most recent book, Facebook: The Inside Story, recounts the history and rise of Facebook from three years of interviews with employees, including Chamath Palihapitiya, Sheryl Sandberg, and Mark Zuckerberg.

Career
In 1978, Steven Levy rediscovered Albert Einstein's brain in the office of the pathologist who removed and preserved it.

In 1984, his book Hackers: Heroes of the Computer Revolution was published. He described a "hacker ethic", which became a guideline to understanding how computers have advanced into the machines that we know and use today. He identified this hacker ethic to consist of key points such as that all information is free, and that this information should be used to "change life for the better".

Levy was a contributing editor to Popular Computing and wrote a monthly column in the magazine, initially called "Telecomputing" and later named "Micro Journal"  and "Computer Journal", from April 1983 to the magazine's closure in December 1985.

Levy was a contributor to Stewart Brand's Whole Earth Software Catalog, first published in 1984.

Levy won the "Computer Press Association Award" for a report he co-wrote in 1998 on the Year 2000 problem.

Levy is writer and Editor at Large for Wired. He was previously chief technology writer and a senior editor for Newsweek. Levy has had articles published in Harper's, Macworld, The New York Times Magazine, The New Yorker, Premiere, and Rolling Stone. In December 1986, Levy founded the Macworld Game Hall of Fame, which Macworld published annually until 2009.

He is regarded as a prominent and respected critic of Apple Inc. In July 2004, Levy wrote a cover story for Newsweek (which also featured an interview with Apple CEO Steve Jobs) which unveiled the 4th generation of the iPod to the world before Apple had officially done so.

Education and personal life
Levy received his bachelor's degree from Temple University and earned a master's degree in literature from Pennsylvania State University. He lives in New York City with his wife, Pulitzer Prize winner Teresa Carpenter, and son.

Bibliography

Books
 Hackers: Heroes of the Computer Revolution (1984)
 The Unicorn's Secret: Murder in the Age of Aquarius (1988)
 Artificial Life: The Quest for a New Creation (1992)
 Insanely Great: The Life and Times of Macintosh, the Computer That Changed Everything (1994)
 Crypto: How the Code Rebels Beat the Government Saving Privacy in the Digital Age (2001)
 The Perfect Thing: How the iPod Shuffles Commerce, Culture, and Coolness (2006)
 In The Plex: How Google Thinks, Works, and Shapes Our Lives (2011)
 Facebook: The Inside Story (2020)

Essays and reporting

References

External links

 Steven Levy's website
 
 
 
 Lebowski Podcast Episode 27 – Steven Levy's Wish List Interview with Steven Levy about The Big Lebowski and his interview with the Coen Brothers.
 Lebowski Podcast Episode 27a – Steven Levy on Technology  Chalupa and Steven Levy talk about blogging, Twitter, internet security, etc.
 
 C-SPAN Q&A interview with Levy on The Perfect Thing, December 24, 2006

1951 births
Living people
Jewish American journalists
American male journalists
American bloggers
American technology writers
Science journalists
Pennsylvania State University alumni
Newsweek people
Wired (magazine) people
21st-century American non-fiction writers
American male bloggers
21st-century American Jews